President Head is a headland forming the east extremity of Snow Island, in the South Shetland Islands, Antarctica. It extends 2.6 km in east-northeast direction, rising to 107 m at St. Sofroniy Knoll.

The name "President Island" was applied by the Stonington sealers in 1820–21 to Snow Island, but that name did not become established. "President Head" was applied by the United Kingdom Antarctic Place-Names Committee (UK-APC) in 1961 in order to preserve the name on this island.

Maps
 L.L. Ivanov et al. Antarctica: Livingston Island and Greenwich Island, South Shetland Islands. Scale 1:100000 topographic map. Sofia: Antarctic Place-names Commission of Bulgaria, 2005.

Notes

References
 President Head. SCAR Composite Antarctic Gazetteer

Headlands of Antarctica